Eupithecia terrenata is a moth in the family Geometridae. It is found in Turkmenistan and Turkey.

References

Moths described in 1903
terrenata
Moths of Asia